"Alison (C'est ma copine à moi)", often simply known as "Alison", is a 1992 song recorded by French singer Jordy Lemoine, credited as Jordy. It was released as the second single from his debut album, Pochette Surprise (1992). It achieved some success in France and the francophone part of Belgium, where it peaked as number one, though it had not the same massive success as that of "Dur dur d'être bébé !"

Charts performance
"Alison (C'est ma copine à moi)" first charted in Belgium (Wallonia), where it debuted at number two on 27 February 1993, then peaked at number one for three weeks in March 1993. In France, it entered the single chart straight at number four on 6 March 1993, gained one place every week, so hit number one from its fourth week, thus dislodging Whitney Houston's international hit "I Will Always Love You". It stayed for five weeks atop, then spent non consecutive four weeks at number two after being dethroned by 2 Unlimited's "No Limit"; it remained in the top ten for 15 weeks and in the top 50 for 19 weeks, dropping from number 11 to number 41 the last week. It achieved Silver status, awarded by the Syndicat National de l'Édition Phonographique. Additionally, it was number six in Finland, and number 22 in Belgium (Flanders). On the European Hot 100 Singles, it debuted at number 53 on 27 February 1993, reached its highest position, number 13, in its 10th and 11th weeks, and cumulated 21 weeks of presence.

Track listings

 7" single - France
 "Alison (C'est ma copine à moi)" — 3:41
 "Dur dur d'être bébé !" (club mix) — 5:22

 CD single - Europe
 "Alison (C'est ma copine à moi)" — 3:41
 "Dur dur d'être bébé !" (club mix) — 5:22

 12" maxi - France, Spain, Netherlands
 "Alison (C'est ma copine à moi)" (dance mix) — 5:12
 "Alison (C'est ma copine à moi)" (alternate mix) — 4:51
 "Alison (C'est ma copine à moi)" (smooth vibe mix) — 4:54

 12" maxi - Netherlands
 "Alison (C'est ma copine à moi)" (baby mix) — 4:49
 "Alison (C'est ma copine à moi)" (album version) — 3:41
 "Alison (C'est ma copine à moi)" (adult underground mix) — 4:53

 12" single - Mexico
 "Alison (C'est ma copine à moi)" — 3:41
 "Dur dur d'être bébé !" — 3:24

 12" single - Brazil
 "Alison (C'est ma copine à moi)" (LP version)
 "Alison (C'est ma copine à moi)" (remix version)

 CD maxi - Germany
 "Alison (C'est ma copine à moi)" (dance mix) — 5:13
 "Alison (C'est ma copine à moi)" (alternate mix) — 4:53
 "Alison (C'est ma copine à moi)" (smooth vibe mix) — 4:54
 "Alison (C'est ma copine à moi)" — 3:41

 Cassette - France
 "Alison (C'est ma copine à moi)" — 3:41
 "Dur dur d'être bébé !" (club mix) — 5:22

Charts and sales

Weekly charts

Year-end charts

Certifications

See also
List of number-one singles of 1993 (France)

References

1992 songs
1993 singles
Jordy (singer) songs
Ultratop 50 Singles (Wallonia) number-one singles
SNEP Top Singles number-one singles